Coiled-coil domain-containing 37, also known as FLJ40083, is a protein that in humans is encoded by the CCDC37 gene (3q21.3).  There is no confirmed function of CCDC37.

Gene

Locus
The human gene CCDC37 is found on chromosome 3 at the band 3q21.3.  It extends from base pairs 90,403,731 to 90,429,231, making the gene 25,500 base pairs long.  It is located on the plus strand and contains 17 exons.

Homology

Paralogs
There is only one paralog for CCDC37 found in humans, CCDC38. CCDC38 is located on chromosome 12.

Orthologs
The ortholog space of CCDC37 is fairly broad including mammals, reptiles, birds, amphibians, fish, invertebrates, and fungi.

Protein

Primary sequence
The gene encodes a protein called CCDC37. This protein in 611 amino acids in length and has a molecular weight of 71.1 kilodaltons and an isoelectric point of pI=6.7.

Domains
CCDC37 contains a DUF4200 region located from amino acid 151 to 269.  There is no known frunction for DUF4200.
CCDC37 also contains three coiled coil domains at amino acids 164–203, 392–436, and 526–571.

Post-translational modifications
The protein has several probable post-translational modifications.  It contains four possible PEST sequence at amino acids 17–36, 293–304, 337–360, and 360–395. It also contains a possible substrate of N-acetyltransferase A at Ser2.

Signal peptides
CCDC37 has a predicted nuclear localization via Reinhard's method (reliability 94.1%) using a bipartite nuclear localization signal peptide starting at amino acid 155: KRQMFLLQYALDVKRRE.
CCDC37 also has a few predicted nuclear export signals I232, L235, I239, and M551.

Expression
CCDC37 protein is widely expressed in mus musculus but only minimally so.  Most areas that express CCDC37 have an expression level of 20-40%.  Expression levels in the trigeminal nerve, testis, medial olfactory epithelium, dorsal root ganglia, and trachea are the highest with almost 75% expression.
CCDC37 is expressed in the cerebellum, medulla, and hippocampal formation in the brain of mus musculus.

Between 20–30 days after birth in mus musculus, CCDC37 expression increases from less than 50% to about 85%.

In rattus norvegicus CCDC37 is highly expressend in oligodendrocyte progenitor cells approximately 85% but only narrowly expressed in oligodendrocytes themselves ~40%.

Interacting proteins

Transcription factors
There are many predicted transcription factor binding sites in the CCDC37 promoter. Below is a table of the best possibilities, which have high confidence values, evolutionary conservation, and/or multiple possible binding sites in the promoter.

Interactions
There have been three proteins found to interact by physical association with CCDC37 through a yeast two-hybrid screen: histone-lysine N-methyltransferase (SUV39H1), histone-lysine N-methyltransferase (SUV39H2), and lysine-specific histone demethylase 1A (KDM1A).

Clinical significance
In a study of the genes expressed in lung squamous cell carcinomas it was found that the promoter region of CCDC37 was hyper methylated causing down regulation of the expression of CCDC37.
In a separate study, CCDC37 was also found in spatial and temporal regions in mice that are associated with hereditary congenital facial paresis (HCFP) gene.  However through knock out experiments in mice it was found that CCDC37 was unlikely to be a causative agent for the HCFP phenotype.

References

Proteins